The Grammy Award for Best Country Duo/Group Performance is an award presented at the Grammy Awards, a ceremony that was established in 1958 and originally called the Gramophone Awards. It was first awarded in 2012, after a major overhaul of Grammy Award categories.
The award combines the previous categories for Best Country Performance by a Duo or Group with Vocal, Best Country Collaboration with Vocals and Best Country Instrumental Performance (if the instrumental recording is performed by a duo or group). The restructuring of these categories was a result of the Recording Academy's wish to decrease the list of categories and awards.

According to the 54th Grammy Awards description guide it is designed for duo/group or collaborative (vocal or instrumental) country recordings and is limited to singles or tracks only.

Recipients

Artists with multiple wins

3 wins
 Dan + Shay
 Little Big Town

2 wins
 The Civil Wars

Artists with multiple nominations

8 nominations
 Brothers Osborne
 Little Big Town

4 nominations
 Dan + Shay

3 nominations
 The Civil Wars
 Miranda Lambert
 Maren Morris
 Dolly Parton

2 nominations
 Jason Aldean
 Dierks Bentley
 Kenny Chesney
 Kelly Clarkson
 Luke Combs
 Vince Gill
 Elle King
 Alison Krauss
 Tim McGraw
 Taylor Swift
 Carrie Underwood
 Keith Urban

See also
Grammy Award for Best Country Solo Performance
Grammy Award for Best Country Song
Grammy Award for Best Country Album

References

External links 
 Official Site of the Grammy Awards

Grammy Awards for country music
Awards established in 2012
Country Duo Group Performance